Ziad Al-Makary is a Lebanese politician currently serving as Minister of Information in the Third Cabinet of Najib Mikati.

References 

Living people
20th-century births
21st-century Lebanese politicians
Information ministers of Lebanon

Marada Movement politicians